The Red Hat Cluster includes software to create a high availability and load balancing cluster. Both can be used on the same system although this use case is unlikely.  Both products, the High Availability Add-On and Load Balancer Add-On, are based on open-source community projects. Red Hat Cluster developers contribute code upstream for the community. Computational clustering is not part of cluster suite, but instead provided by Red Hat MRG.

High-Availability Add-On

The High Availability Add-On is Red Hat's implementation of Linux-HA.  It attempts to ensure service availability by monitoring other nodes of the cluster.  All nodes of the cluster must agree on their configuration and shared services state before the cluster is considered to have a quorum and services are able to be started.

The primary form of communicating node status is via a network device (commonly Ethernet), although in the case of possible network failure, quorum can be decided through secondary methods such as shared storage or multicast.

Software services, filesystems and network status can be monitored and controlled by the cluster suite, services and resources can be failed over to other network nodes in case of failure.

The Cluster forcibly terminates a cluster node's access to services or resources, via fencing, to ensure the node and data is in a known state.  The node is terminated by removing power (known as STONITH) or access to the shared storage. More recent versions of Red Hat use a distributed lock manager, to allow fine grained locking and no single point of failure.  Earlier versions of the cluster suite relied on a "grand unified lock manager" (GULM) which could be clustered, but still presented a point of failure if the nodes acting as GULM servers were to fail.  GULM was last available in Red Hat Cluster Suite 4.

Technical details

 Support for up to 128 nodes (16 nodes on Red Hat Enterprise Linux 3, 4, 5, and 6)
 NFS (Unix) /SMB /GFS /GFS2 (Multiple Operating systems) File system failover support
 Service failover support
 Fully shared storage subsystem
 Comprehensive data integrity
 SCSI and fibre channel support
 OCF and LSM resource agents

Load Balancing Add-On

Red Hat adapted the Piranha load balancing software to allow for transparent load balancing and failover between servers.  The application being balanced does not require special configuration to be balanced, instead a Red Hat Enterprise Linux server with the load balancer configured, intercepts and routes traffic based on metrics/rules set on the load balancer.

Support and Product Life-Cycle

Red Hat cluster suite support is tied to a matching version of Red Hat Enterprise Linux and follows the same maintenance policy.  The product has no activation, time limit or remote kill switch, it will remain working after the support life cycle has ended. It is partially supported running under VMware Virtual Machine.

History

The cluster suite is available in:
 Red Hat Enterprise Linux 2.1 
 Red Hat Enterprise Linux 3.x, 4.x, 5.x - with supported Global File System (v1.x) as a filesystem
 Red Hat Enterprise Linux 5
 Red Hat Enterprise Linux 5.3 and later  - with Global File System 2
 Red Hat Enterprise Linux 6.0 and later, with Corosync (project), CMAN, and RGManager
 Red Hat Enterprise Linux 6.5 and later, with Corosync (project), CMAN, and RGManager, or Pacemaker Resource Manager
 Red Hat Enterprise Linux 7.0 and later , with Corosync (project) and Pacemaker Resource Manager

See also

 Global File System
 Logical Volume Manager (Linux)

References

External links
Red Hat Cluster Suite 
Configuring and Managing a Cluster
 best how to not presuming/requiring gui
Red Hat Enterprise MRG

Cluster computing
High-availability cluster computing
Red Hat software
Virtualization software for Linux